Raymond Lamy (1903–1982) was a French film editor active from the 1930s to the 1970s. He also directed two feature films Clodoche (1938) and Miroir (1947). He edited a number of films for the director Robert Bresson.

Selected filmography

 Fanny (1932)
 The Red Robe (1933)
 Madame Sans-Gêne (1941)
 The Stairs Without End (1943)
 Marie-Martine (1943)
 Mademoiselle Béatrice (1943)
 The Eleventh Hour Guest (1945)
 Land Without Stars (1946)
 Miroir (1947)
 La Poison (1951)
 Deburau (1951)
 Alarm in Morocco (1953)
 A Caprice of Darling Caroline (1953)
 The Virtuous Scoundrel (1953)
 Royal Affairs in Versailles (1954)
 Les hommes ne pensent qu'à ça (1954)
 The French, They Are a Funny Race (1955)
 Napoléon (1955)
 A Man Escaped (1956)
 Escapade (1957)
 A Bomb for a Dictator (1957)
 Pickpocket (1959)
 Le Crime ne paie pas (1962)
 Au Hasard Balthazar (1966)
 Mouchette (1967)
 A Gentle Woman (1969)
 Four Nights of a Dreamer (1971)

References

Bibliography
 Rège, Philippe. Encyclopedia of French Film Directors, Volume 1. Scarecrow Press, 2009.

External links

1903 births
1982 deaths
French film directors
French film editors
People from Pointe-à-Pitre